Héros was a 74-gun French ship of the line built at Rochefort from 1795 to 1801 by engineer Roland. She was one of the numerous  ships designed by Jacques-Noël Sané.

Career 

She took part in the French occupation of Santo Domingo, notably ferrying Toussaint Louverture to France after his arrest.

She took part in the Battle of Trafalgar (21 October 1805) under Commander Poulain, and was one of the five French ships to survive the battle, although Poulain was killed at 13:15 and replaced by Lieutenant Conor. She took part in the counter-attack led by Julien Cosmao, and returned to Cádiz.

In the aftermath of the battle (28 October 1805), Jean Boniface Textoris, Chief Medical Officer of the French squadron, switched from the Bucentaur to the Héros to stay there until 21 April 1806 before passing on the hospital transport Achille.

Héros stayed in Cádiz until she was captured by the Spanish in 1808. Renamed Heroe, she was broken up at Ferrol in 1845.

Notes and references

Notes

References

Bibliography 
 Fonds Marine. Campagnes (opérations ; divisions et stations navales ; missions diverses). Inventaire de la sous-série Marine BB4. Tome deuxième : BB4 1 à 482 (1790-1826) 

Ships of the line of the French Navy
Téméraire-class ships of the line
1801 ships